Dmitry Kosenko may refer to:

Dmitry Sergeyevich Kosenko. (born 1986), Russian footballer